Sphodromantis lagrecai is a species of praying mantis found in Kenya, Tanzania, and Uganda.

See also
African mantis
List of mantis genera and species

References

Lagrecai
Mantodea of Africa
Insects of Kenya
Insects of Tanzania
Insects of Uganda
Insects described in 1989